Ajmal Masroor (born 19 October 1971) is a Bangladeshi-born British imam, broadcaster and politician. He is well known for being a television presenter on political discussions and on Muslim channels.

Early life
Masroor was born in Sylhet District, Bangladesh and came to Britain at the age of one when his parents immigrated from the country. He moved back to Bangladesh a few years later at the age of seven due to his father's concerns about different cultures and the possibility of losing their Muslim identities. However, they returned when he was at the age of 13.

When living in the East End, Masroor experienced racism against the Bangladeshis in the areas, with properties being damaged. He was brought up in Shadwell, and attended the Bluegate Fields School on Cable Street. He is the oldest of six children. At the age of 19, his father attempted to force him into a marriage in Bangladesh, but was unsuccessful because Masroor challenged his father, saying forced marriage is not acceptable in Islam. He then married a Hungarian, Henrietta Szovati (who had converted to Islam), and they now have two children.

He went to Hammersmith and West London College to study his GCSEs and A Levels, and while studying he was very active in student unions and founded the college's first Islamic society. Masroor took admission at School of Oriental and African Studies (SOAS) to study BA Politics and Arabic, and then Masters at Birkbeck College in Islamic Studies. He also studied Relationship Counselling with Relate.

Career
Masroor is primarily an educator who specialises in relationship counselling, spiritual coaching and transformative training. He is an author, broadcaster and fundraiser. Masroor runs the Barefoot Institute, which provides support and education for Muslim relationship, including marriage, divorce and family counselling, mediation and coaching. He runs transformative courses using Quranic principles covering a range of subjects including Learning to be a Peacemaker, 30 Rules of Life, 10 Steps to Survival and Success, 10 Principles of Interpersonal Relationship etc.

Masroor is a traveling imam (unpaid), who leads Friday prayers at various mosques across the United Kingdom including Palmers Green mosque, West Ealing mosque, Wightman Road mosque Haringey. and Finsbury Park Mosque in London as well as Abdullah Quilliam Mosque in Liverpool. He is also invited to lead Friday prayer at Leeds Grand Mosque and Greenwich Islamic Centre occasionally.

Masroor has been involved in the Muslim Council of Britain in various capacities from its inception and was recently elected on its National Council. He spent his youth as an active member and one of the leaders of the Young Muslims and later joined the Islamic Society of Britain and served as its chairperson for three years.

He was the Director of Communities in Action, an organisation founded to empower communities to organise, deliver and realise their full potential. He was the Chairman of ChildrenPlus, a charity that focused on providing humanitarian assistance to poverty stricken and most vulnerable children around the world.

Masroor was selected as Liberal Democrats prospective parliamentary candidate for West Ham in the 2005 General Election, but stood down after being criticised for posting on the Muslim Public Affairs Committee forum.

He stood in the 2010 General Election, for the Bethnal Green and Bow constituency in East London, representing the Liberal Democrats,  came second with 10,210 votes (20.1%) to Labour candidate Rushanara Ali won with 21,784 votes (42.9%).

Masroor is a well known broadcaster and presenter on various TV and Radio channels in the UK. He currently presents his own programmes on Islam Channel and on Channel S, where he presents an English programme called Let's Talk. He is also part of the panel in a programme broadcast by Channel 4, called Shariah TV. On Channel 4, he also presented a programme called Make Me a Muslim - he asks six non-Muslims and one lapsed Muslim to follow Islamic teachings for three weeks. On 10 May 2009, Masroor presented a programme called "Celebrity Lives - Sharia Style" which was broadcast on BBC One.

He has also appeared on major news channels such as the BBC, CNN and many other channels as a commentator on social, political and religious issues. On 30 January 2011, he appeared on the BBC show The Big Questions, and in 2019 he appeared on BBC's Newsnight.

In October 2013, Masroor was alerted by anti-terrorist police that he and a number of other prominent Muslim figures in the UK who had spoken out against Islamist extremism were targeted by a propaganda video created by Al-Shabaab, the terrorist group responsible for the attack on the Westgate shopping mall in Kenya: the video urged jihadists in the UK to take action, citing the murder of Lee Rigby as an example to follow. Interviewed by Al Jazeera, Masroor said of the video: "It is a terrible piece of work and the content is vile and disgusting and horrific in many ways. It is a group of people who are glorifying violence and death. It didn't make me scared. It just made me angry and more determined.". He also received a second death threat in 2015 from the ISIS terrorist cell in Iraq and Syria that led him to moving his home and his family relocating to another country for a short while.

In July 2015, Masroor was interviewed by Nadia Ali on BBC Asian Network about his Ramadan memories.

In October 2018 the Muslim World League fired him from the Fitzrovia Mosque for criticising Saudi Arabia and crown prince Mohammed bin Salman, following remarks he made about the disappearance of Jamal Khashoggi and corruption in the royal family. The Muslim World League released a statement saying "But since he continued provoking public opinion against the individuals, governments, causing stir in the society, shaming and accusing falsely, no option was left but to stop dealing with him in anyway."

He spoke at an event immediately after the murder of Jamal Khashoggi and said that Mohammed Bin Salman was directly responsible for the murder of Mr Khashoggi and he should be tried for him crime. He said that Saudi Arabia was ruled by illegitimate regime and the civilised world should boycott the country, not sell them arms, intelligence or should never offer its rulers the red carpet treatment when they come to the UK or Europe.

Personal life
Masroor currently lives in Haringey, London. His interests include learning about new cultures and world food, playing badminton, and reading based on history, society and politics. He is a keen cyclist and gardener.

Masroor has a brother, not sharing the same surname, Mustafa Almansur, who was the organiser of the Grenfell tower protests in 2017. Almansur was rumoured to be a former terrorist suspect.

Despite Masroor being an Imam and leading Friday prayers, several of his siblings have chosen to leave Islam. His brother Amir Moshkur Hussain is an outspoken critic of Islam and follows a liberal, humanist approach to religion and philosophy.

On 17 December 2015, Masroor was stopped by a U.S. embassy staff from boarding Virgin Atlantic flight at Heathrow Airport to John F. Kennedy International Airport. Masroor was informed that his U.S. business visa had been revoked and received no further explanation as to why he was being prevented from travelling, despite travelling to the U.S. four times earlier in the year. On 22 December, he was invited to the U.S. embassy to speak about the matter but was still not given a reason, nor an apology. On 13 January 2016, it was reported that he was prevented from travelling to the U.S. and his visa was revoked over concerns about one of his 28,000 Facebook followers. Masroor set up a website, called www.flyingwhilemuslim.org.uk, so other Muslims can document any similar experiences they have faced while trying to travel to U.S.

In 2019 the US embassy in London has reissued Masroor a valid US visa and has welcomed him to travel to the USA anytime.

Awards and nominations
In January 2013 and 2015, Masroor was nominated for the Religious Advocate of the Year award at the British Muslim Awards.

See also
 British Bangladeshi
 List of British Bangladeshis
 Islam in England

References

External links

 
 
 Ajmal Masroor on Liberal Democrats
 Ajmal Masroor on theguardian.com

 Casciani, Dominic. Muslim hope among terror 'wreckage'. BBC News. 11 September 2002
 Integration, not assimilation. ABC. 17 July 2005
 Muslim body welcomes Pope apology. BBC News. 17 September 2006
 Masroor, Ajmal. Britain has failed many young Muslims: Imam Ajmal Masroor. New Statesman. 14 June 2007
 Soul's Search by Ajmal Masroor - Google Video

1971 births
Living people
Bangladeshi Muslims
British Muslims
Bangladeshi emigrants to England
British people of Bangladeshi descent
British politicians of Bangladeshi descent
British television presenters
Bangladeshi imams
British imams
Sunni imams
Liberal Democrats (UK) parliamentary candidates
The Guardian journalists
People from Sylhet District
People from Shadwell
Alumni of SOAS University of London
Imams in the United Kingdom
21st-century Bengalis
20th-century Bengalis
Islamic scholars in the United Kingdom
Bengali Muslim scholars of Islam